Kirkella is a British cod and haddock freezer trawler based in Kingston upon Hull, England. The crew's accommodation contains a gym and cinema.

Kirkellas total annual catch fell within quotas agreed by the EU and Denmark, Greenland, Faroe Islands and Norway, but the vessel has been idle since January 2021. Normally fishing off-Norway is a large part of the catch, but after the UK's exit from the European Union, the UK government was unable to establish quotas directly with their Norwegian counterparts.

Kirkella provided approximately 10 per cent of the cod and haddock consumed in fish & chip shops.

Kirkellas main areas of operation are the Barents Sea, Greenland waters, NAFO (northwest Atlantic) and the Norwegian Sea. Each expedition takes four to six weeks.

Her Royal Highness The Princess Royal named Kirkella on 24 April 2019 in a ceremony attended by officers, crew and shareholders of Kirkellas owner, UK Fisheries Limited. Decked out in bunting and naval flags, Kirkella arrived at Greenwich on the day before, steamed under a raised Tower Bridge before turning opposite the Tower of London and then returning to moor at Greenwich, close to Cutty Sark Gardens.

Rolls-Royce Marine AS of Ålesund, Norway, designed the boat, with the CRIST shipyard in Poland building the hull and Myklebust Verft AS  doing the fitting out.

References

External links
UK Fisheries Ltd (ukfisheries.net)
Kirkella (marinetraffic.com)
www.greatbritishfish.com

Trawlers
Fishing vessels of the United Kingdom